William Holms may refer to:
 William Holms (politician)
 William Holms (engineer)

See also
 William Holmes (disambiguation)